George Zebrowski (born December 28, 1945) is an American science fiction writer and editor who has written and edited a number of books, and is a former editor of The Bulletin of the Science Fiction Writers of America. He lives with author Pamela Sargent, with whom he has co-written a number of novels, including Star Trek novels.

Zebrowski won the John W. Campbell Memorial Award in 1999 for his novel Brute Orbits.  Three of his short stories, "Heathen God," "The Eichmann Variations," and "Wound the Wind," have been nominated for the Nebula Award, and "The Idea Trap" was nominated for the Theodore Sturgeon Award.

Bibliography

Novels
The Omega Point (1972) [Omega Point #2]
The Star Web (1975)
Ashes and Stars (1977) [Omega Point #1
Sunspacer (1978)
Macrolife (1979)
A Silent Shout (1979)
Mirror of Minds (1983) [Omega Point #3]
The Omega Point Trilogy (1983)
The Stars Will Speak (1985)
Stranger Suns (1989)
Behind the Stars (1996)
Sunspacers Trilogy (1996)
The Killing Star (1996) with Charles Pellegrino
Brute Orbits (1998)
Cave of Stars (1999)
Empties (2009)

Star Trek novels
A Fury Scorned (1996). Co-written with Pamela Sargent. Based on Star Trek: The Next Generation television series. 
Heart of the Sun (1997). Co-written with Pamela Sargent. Based on Star Trek: The Original Series television series.
Dyson Sphere (April, 1999). Co-written with Charles R. Pellegrino. Based on Star Trek: The Next Generation television series. 
Across the Universe (October, 1999). Co-written with Pamela Sargent. Based on Star Trek: The Original Series television series.
Garth of Izar (2003). Co-written with Pamela Sargent. Based on Star Trek: The Original Series television series.

Collections
The Monadic Universe (1977)
Swift Thoughts (2002)
In the Distance, and Ahead in Time (2002)
Black Pockets: And Other Dark Thoughts (2006)

Anthologies edited
Human Machines: An Anthology of Stories About Cyborgs (1975) with Thomas Scortia
Tomorrow Today: No. 1 (1975)
Faster than Light (1976) with Jack Dann
Three in Space (1981) with Jack Dann and Pamela Sargent
Creations: The Quest for Origins in Story and Science (1983) with Isaac Asimov and Martin Greenberg
Nebula Awards 20 (1985)
Nebula Awards 21 (1986)
Synergy: New Science Fiction, Volume 1 (1987)
Nebula Awards 22 (1988)
Synergy: New Science Fiction, Volume 2 (1988)
Synergy: New Science Fiction, Volume 3 (1988)
Synergy: New Science Fiction, Volume 4 (1989)
Three in Time (1997) with Jack Dann and Pamela Sargent
Synergy SF: New Science Fiction (2004)

Nonfiction
Beneath the Red Star: Studies on International Science Fiction (1996)
Skylife: Space Habitats in Story and Science (2000) with Gregory Benford

References

Sources
 The Encyclopedia of Science Fiction
 SFWA
 ISFDB

External links
 
Golden Gryphon Press official site - About Swift Thoughts
Golden Gryphon Press official site - About Black Pockets and Other Dark Thoughts

1945 births
Living people
American science fiction writers
Austrian emigrants to the United States
People from Villach
20th-century American novelists
21st-century American novelists
American male novelists
20th-century American male writers
21st-century American male writers